The 1921 Liège–Bastogne–Liège was the 11th edition of the Liège–Bastogne–Liège cycle race and was held on 29 May 1921. The race started and finished in Liège. The race was won by Louis Mottiat.

General classification

References

1921
1921 in Belgian sport